This is a list of full admirals in the Royal Danish Navy. The rank of admiral (or full admiral to distinguish it from the lower admiral ranks) is the highest rank currently achievable by serving officers. It ranks above vice admiral and was previously itself below Lieutenant general admiral.

Persons listed are shown with the rank of full admiral. Those who only held the rank of full admiral on an acting basis are not shown.

List of admirals

1500

1600

1700

1800

1900

2000

See also
 Admiral (Denmark)
 List of Danish vice admirals
 List of Danish full generals

References
Citations

Bibliography
 
 
 
 
 
 
 

Danish admirals